The 57th Neste Oil Rally Finland was the 9th round of the 2007 World Rally Championship. It was run on 2–5 August 2007 and based in Jyväskylä, Finland.

Results

Retirements 

  Kristian Sohlberg - rolled (SS2);
  Jari-Matti Latvala - went off the road - damaged rollcage (SS7);
  Manfred Stohl - rolled (SS13)
  Gareth Jones - went off the road (SS13)
  Juho Hänninen - mechanical (SS14)
  Daniel Sordo - engine failure (SS15)
  Petter Solberg - steering problems (SS15/16)
  Jan Kopecký - went off the road (SS21)

Special Stages

Championship standings after the event

Drivers' championship

Manufacturers' championship

External links 

 Results on official site - WRC.com
 Results on eWRC-results.com
 Results on RallyBase.nl

Finland
2007
Rally Finland, 2007